= Hoopers Valley Island =

- Location within New York Adirondack Park Location within the United States

Geography
- Location: Susquehanna River
- Coordinates: 42°01′42″N 76°23′29″W
- Highest elevation: 764 ft (232.9 m)

Administration
- United States
- State: New York
- County: Tioga
- Village: Hoopers Valley

Hoopers Valley Island is an island located by Hoopers Valley, New York, on the Susquehanna River.

A link to the map of this island: https://www.google.com/maps/place/Hoopers+Valley,+NY+13812/@42.0258716,-76.3947104,15z/data=!4m5!3m4!1s0x89daa1bbf1ce9323:0xdb44eda189a7f07c!8m2!3d42.0264632!4d-76.3929937
